was the pseudonym of a major figure in Taishō and early Shōwa period Japanese painting, and is regarded as one of the founders of the Japanese painting technique of nihonga. His real name was Yasuda Shinzaburō.

Biography 
He was born in Nihonbashi, Tokyo, as the fourth son of a Japanese restaurant owner. He initially studied Tosa school painting at the Tōkyō Bijutsu Gakkō (the predecessor to the Tokyo National University of Fine Arts and Music), under Kobori Tomoto. While in school, his talent was recognized by Okakura Kakuzō who sent him to Nara to study classical paintings in the Yamato-e style. While in Nara, he first viewed the ancient murals on the walls of the Kondo chapel of the Buddhist temple of Hōryū-ji, and this was to have a deep impact on his future style of painting.

From 1914, Yasuda assisted Yokoyama Taikan in re-establishing the Japan Fine Arts Academy (Nihon Bijutsuin).  From 1944 to 1951, he taught as a professor at the Tokyo National University of Fine Arts and Music. In 1948, he was awarded the Order of Culture by the Japanese government, and was appointed a member of the Japan Art Academy. In the post-war period, he assisted Maeda Seison on restoration and preservation work on the murals of Hōryū-ji.

Yasuda was known primarily for his paintings on historical themes, and occasionally for portraiture or bird-and-flower paintings. One of his principal disciples was noted Nihonga painter Yuki Ogura.

Important works 
Yasuda's works have been selected as the subject of commemorative postage stamps three times by the Japanese post office:

 1981: Spring in Asuka with Nukada Okimi, as part of the Modern Art series.
 1986: Mount Fuji, to commemorate the 1986 Tokyo Summit
 1996: Window, to commemorate the 1996 Philatelic Week

References 

1884 births
1978 deaths
Nihonga painters
Artists from Tokyo
20th-century Japanese painters
Buddhist artists
Imperial household artists